Abelmoschus crinitus is a species of flowering plant belonging to the mallow family. It was first described by Nathaniel Wallich in 1830.

Habitat
A. crinitus is native to China, the Philippines, India, Laos, Myanmar, Nepal, Thailand, Vietnam and Java. There have been a number of reports of the plant growing in Pakistan but its presence is rare. It is found in deciduous forests and on grassy slopes between 300 and 1300 m.

Characteristics
A. crinitus is a perennial shrub. The leaves are "ovate-pentagonal" in shape with 3–5 shallow lobes and reach a maximum size of 8×7 cm. Stellate Trichome is present on both the upper and lower leaf surfaces, though it is more dense on the underside. The flowers are a "creamy-white to deep orange-yellow" colour and occasionally have a reddish centre. They have 5–6 bracts measuring 7–11 mm in length which are green when in flower and brown when in fruit.

References

Wall. 1830. Plantae Asiaticae Rariores 1: 39, t. 44.

crinitus
Flora of the Indian subcontinent
Flora of China
Flora of Indo-China
Flora of Java
Flora of the Philippines